Bargoda is a village in the Purba Midnapur district of West Bengal, India. It is located in the Nandakumar block.

Demography
Bargoda is situated on the bank of Kansabati river. It is part of Nandakumar Police Station area. The village has three primary schools and one high school. The population of the village is approximately 4500.

References 

Villages in Purba Medinipur district